Social criticism is a form of academic or journalistic criticism focusing on social issues in contemporary society, in particular with respect to perceived injustices and power relations in general.

Social criticism of the Enlightenment

The origins of modern social criticism go back at least to the Age of Enlightenment. According to the historian Jonathan Israel the roots of the radical enlightenment can be found in Spinoza and his circle. Radical enlighteners like Jean Meslier were not satisfied with the social criticism of the time, which was essentially a criticism of religion. The focus of his criticism was the suffering of the peasants. In addition, there was also a criticism of civilization for religious reasons, such as that which emanated from the Quakers in England. Jean-Jacques Rousseau developed a social criticism in his political philosophy which influenced the French Revolution  and in his pedagogy.

Academic forms
The positivism dispute between critical rationalism, e.g. between Karl Popper and the Frankfurt School, dealt with the question of whether research in the social sciences should be "neutral" or consciously adopt a partisan view.

Academic works of social criticism can belong to social philosophy, political economy, sociology, social psychology, psychoanalysis but also cultural studies and other disciplines or reject academic forms of discourse.

In literature and music

Social criticism can also be expressed in a fictional form, e.g. in a revolutionary novel like The Iron Heel (1908) by Jack London; in dystopian novels like Aldous Huxley's Brave New World (1932), George Orwell's Nineteen Eighty-Four (1949), Ray Bradbury's Fahrenheit 451 (1953), or Rafael Grugman's Nontraditional Love (2008); or in children's books or films.

Fictional literature can have a significant social impact. For example, the 1852 novel Uncle Tom's Cabin, by Harriet Beecher Stowe furthered the anti-slavery movement in the United States, and the 1885 novel Ramona, by Helen Hunt Jackson, brought about changes in laws regarding Native Americans. Similarly, Upton Sinclair's 1906 novel The Jungle helped create new laws related to public health and food handling, and Arthur Morrison's 1896 novel A Child of the Jago caused England to change its housing laws. George Orwell and Charles Dickens wrote Animal Farm and A Tale of Two Cities, respectively, to express their disillusionment with society and human nature. Animal Farm, written in 1944, is a book that tells the animal fable of a farm in which the farm animals revolt against their human masters. It is an example of social criticism in literature in which Orwell satirized the events in Russia after the Bolshevik Revolution. He anthropomorphizes the animals, and alludes each one to a counterpart in Russian history. A Tale of Two Cities also typifies this kind of literature. Besides the central theme of love, is another prevalent theme, that of a revolution gone bad. He shows us that, unfortunately, human nature causes us to be vengeful and, for some of us, overly ambitious. Both these books are similar in that both describe how, even with the best of intentions, our ambitions get the best of us. Both authors also demonstrate that violence and the Machiavellian attitude of "the ends justifying the means" are deplorable. They also express their authors' disenchantment with the state of evolution of human nature.

According to Frederick Douglass, "Where justice is denied, where poverty is enforced, where ignorance prevails, and where any one class is made to feel that society is an organized conspiracy to oppress, rob and degrade them, neither persons nor property will be safe."

The authors imply, that even if we begin with honourable intentions, there will be some who will let their basic instincts take control. Animal Farm portrays this nature through parodying events in real history. Given the right conditions, these events could happen anywhere. Take for example, a leader becoming overly ambitious, to the point of harming his people for more power.

In A Tale of Two Cities, Dickens examines the inner soul, and shares with us how people are driven to the valley of human emotions, where desperation and anger reign, and what could happen afterwards if we let these emotions build up inside. Every human being is capable of becoming a ruthless, opportunistic being like Napoleon or Madame Defarge, if placed in the right place, at the right time.

Social criticism is certainly present in opera (e.g. The Cradle Will Rock or Trouble in Tahiti) and other types of classical music, such as the Symphony No.13, called "Babi Yar", of Dmitri Shostakovich. Other musical expressions of social criticism are frequent in punk and rap music, examples being "Pretty Vacant" by Sex Pistols and "Brenda's Got a Baby" by 2Pac. Heavy metal and industrial rock bands such as Black Sabbath, Metallica, Marilyn Manson, Nine Inch Nails and Megadeth also use social criticism extensively, particularly in their earlier works.

Literature

Classical writings 
 Étienne de La Boétie: Discourse on Voluntary Servitude (circa 1560)
 Baruch de Spinoza: Tractatus Theologico-Politicus, 1670
 Immanuel Kant: What Is Enlightenment? 1784
 Mary Wollstonecraft: A Vindication of the Rights of Woman 1792
 Karl Marx: Das Kapital. 1867
 Mikhail Bakunin: Statism and Anarchy 1873
 Friedrich Nietzsche: Untimely Meditations. (1873–1876)
 Upton Sinclair: The Jungle. 1906
 Walter Benjamin: Zur Kritik der Gewalt. In: Archiv für Sozialwissenschaften und Sozialpolitik, 1921, engl. Toward the Critique of Violence: A Critical Edition, Stanford University Press 2021
 Georg Lukács: History and Class Consciousness. 1923
 Virginia Woolf: A Room of One's Own. 1929
 Sigmund Freud: Civilization and Its Discontents. 1930
 Max Horkheimer: Traditional and Critical Theory (1937)
 Norbert Elias: Über den Prozeß der Zivilisation. 1939, engl The Civilizing Process
 Friedrich August von Hayek: The Road to Serfdom. 1944
 Max Horkheimer, Theodor W. Adorno: Dialektik der Aufklärung. 1947, engl. Dialectic of Enlightenment
 Simone de Beauvoir: Le Deuxième Sexe, 1949, engl. The Second Sex. 
 Aimé Césaire: Discours sur le colonialisme (1950), engl. Discourse on Colonialism
 Ernst Bloch: Das Prinzip Hoffnung (1938 bis 1947), engl. The Principle of Hope
 Erich Fromm: The art of loving. 1956
 Milovan Đilas: The New Class: An Analysis of the Communist System 1957
 Friedrich August von Hayek: The Constitution of Liberty. 1960
 Frantz Fanon: Les damnés de la terre, engl. The Wretched of the Earth
 Rachel Carson: Silent Spring (1962)
 Herbert Marcuse: One-Dimensional Man (1964)
 Guy Debord: La Société du spectacle (1967), engl. The Society of the Spectacle
 Louis Althusser: Idéologie et appareils idéologiques d’État, published in La Pensée, no 151, june 1970, engl. Ideology and Ideological State Apparatuses
 Michel Foucault: Surveiller et punir: Naissance de la prison (1975), engl. Discipline and Punish
 Michel Foucault: La volonté de savoir, engl. vol. 1 of The History of Sexuality
 Cornelius Castoriadis:  L'Institution imaginaire de la société (1975), engl. Imaginary Institution of Society: Creativity and Autonomy in the Social–historical World, London: Polity, 1997 (new edition)
 Pierre Bourdieu: La distinction: Critique sociale du jugement (1979), engl. Distinction: A Social Critique of the Judgement of Taste

Important contemporary works 
 Audre Lorde: Sister Outsider, 1984
 Michel Henry: La barbarie. Bernard Grasset, Paris 1987,engl. Barbarism, Continuum 2012
 Gayatri Chakravorty Spivak: Can the Subaltern Speak? in: Cary Nelson & Lawrence Grossberg (Hgg.): Marxism and the Interpretation of Culture, University of Illinois Press, Chicago 1988, 
 Judith Butler: Gender Trouble. 1989
 Monique Wittig: The Straight Mind and other Essays, 1992
 Raewyn Connell: Masculinities. 1995
 Richard Sennett: The corrosion of character. The Personal Consequences Of Work In the New Capitalism. 1998
 Noam Chomsky: Manufacturing Consent. 1988. Profit over people. 2000
 Gilbert Rist: Le développement, Histoire d’une croyance occidentale. Presses de Sciences Po, Paris 1996 – engl. The History of Development: From Western Origins to Global Faith. Zed Books, London 2003
 Arno Gruen: The Insanity of Normality: Understanding Human Destructiveness. Human Development Books, Berkeley 2007

See also
 Call-out culture
 Critical Legal Studies
 Critical Race Theory
 Critique of political economy
 Cultural critic
 Feminism
 Marxism
 Postcolonialism
 Political Cinema

References

Criticism
Cultural studies
Justice
Left-wing politics
Liberalism
Majority–minority relations
New Left
Progressivism
Social commentary